Cinzio Scagliotti (26 March 1911, in Alessandria – December 1985, in Florence) was an Italian professional football player and coach, who played as a midfielder.

1911 births
1985 deaths
Italian footballers
Serie A players
U.S. Alessandria Calcio 1912 players
ACF Fiorentina players
Juventus F.C. players
A.C. Milan players
A.C. Prato players
U.S. Salernitana 1919 players
Italian football managers
A.C. Cesena managers
People from Alessandria
Association football midfielders
Footballers from Piedmont
Sportspeople from the Province of Alessandria